Amélia dos Santos Costa Cardia (1855–1938), born in Lisbon, was one of the first female doctors in Portugal. She attended the Polytechnic School from 1883 until 1887, and then attended the Medical-Surgical School of Lisbon, graduating on July 20, 1891. Her doctoral thesis was on yellow fever. She was the first woman in Portugal to work in a hospital internship. She also founded a nursing home which she led for almost ten years, and was part of the National League Against Tuberculosis and Association of Medical Sciences. She also belonged to the Portuguese Spiritist Federation. She was also a writer.

Publications
 Episódios da Guerra, 1919
 Visionário : romance psicológico, 1932
 Pecadora : romance psicológico, 1934
 Alforria : romance psicológico, 1936

References

1855 births
1938 deaths
People from Lisbon
20th-century Portuguese physicians
19th-century Portuguese physicians
20th-century Portuguese women writers
20th-century Portuguese writers
Portuguese women physicians
19th-century Portuguese women writers
19th-century Portuguese writers
20th-century women physicians
19th-century women physicians